Don Carlo Emanuele Maria (Carlos Manuel María) Ruspoli, Duke of Morignano (born 29 October 1949) is a nobleman and architect. Firstborn son of Galeazzo Maria Alvise Emanuele Ruspoli, 2nd Duke of Morignano and first wife Doña María Elisa Soler y Borghi (San Salvador, 25 June 1926 – Madrid, 15 November 2016), of the Marquises of Rabell. He is Doctor of Architecture of the University of Rome, writer, anthropologist and researcher.

Marriage and child

He married at Church of Our Lady of Peace in La Puebla de Montalbán, near Toledo, Toledo Province, 11 October 1975 Doña María de Gracia de Solís-Beaumont y Téllez-Girón, Lasso de la Vega y Duque de Estrada (Madrid, 12 March 1957 – Madrid, 20 February 2021), Grandee of Spain, 19th Duchess of Plasencia (22 February 1974), of the Dukes of Osuna and Gandía also Spanish Red Cross nurse and restorer, by whom he had an only daughter:

 Donna María de Gracia Giacinta Ruspoli y Solís-Beaumont, Soler y Téllez-Girón dei Principi Ruspoli (Madrid, 16 June 1977 –), 16th Marquesa del Villar de Grajanejos (Order of 1 December 1995 by cedance of her mother and Letter of 25 December 1995), and Nobile di Viterbo. She married, 28 November 2009 Don Javier Isidro González de Gregorio y Molina (Madrid, 7 November 1971 –), of the Condes de La Puebla de Valverde. She is an MBA and her husband is a Doctor of Laws, Bachelor of Law and Executive MBA. They had two daughters, Doña María de Gracia y Doña Blanca Micaela González de Gregorio y Ruspoli.

Notable published works

 "Retratos. Anécdotas y secretos de los linajes Borja, Téllez-Girón, Marescotti y Ruspoli" (2011). 
 "Asesinato en el Letrán (2012).  & 
 "El Confaloniero" (2012).  & 
 "El Profeso. Una epopeya de un héroe en la Edad Media" (2012).  & 
 "El Profeso en Tíbet" (2012).  & 
 "Muerte de Profesos" (2012).  & 
 "Orientalia. Antropología, cultura, religión, historia y leyendas de Oriente" (2012).  & 
 "El Profeso y la Monja" (2013). ASIN B00DVRJRBC
 "El Profeso y el Diablo" (2013). ASIN B00DWGUCPC 
 "El Profeso y el Emperador" (2013). ASIN B00DW6NLPK
 "El Profeso y el Grial" (2013). ASIN B00DWH1B4C
 "La Hija del Profeso" (2013). Winner of the Sial Pigmalión International Literary Award (2013). ASIN B00DW6TADW
 "Los Bellegarde de Saint-Lary" (2013). ASIN B00DWWOO50
 "El Profeso y el Opio" (2014). 
 "El Profeso y la Masonería" (2015). 
 "El Profeso y la Parapsicología" (2015). Winner of the Rubén Darío International Literary Award (2015). 
 "La Hija del Profeso" (2016). 
 "La Duquesa de Plasencia. Historia de un gran amor" (2022).

Decorations

  Knight of Honour and Devotion in Obedience of the Sovereign Military Order of Malta.
  Knight Grand Cross Pro Merito Melitensi [Civilian Class] of the Sovereign Military Order of Malta.
  Knight Grand Cross of Justice of the Sacred Military Constantinian Order of Saint George (1990).
  Knight Commander of the Pontifical Equestrian Order of Saint Gregory the Great (04/06/2004).
  Officer's Cross of the Order of Isabella the Catholic.
  Commander of the Order of Merit of the Italian Republic (14 March 2005).

Cultural and charitable interests

 Academic Numerary of the Spanish Melitense Academy of the Order of Malta. 
 Contributor to the Matritense Royal Academy of Heraldry and Genealogy.
 National Association of the Order of Malta of El Salvador.
 Foundation for Sustainable Development.
 New Future Association.
 Religious brotherhoods and associations in Seville and Espejo.

Ancestry

Notes

External links

Carlo Emanuele Ruspoli on a genealogical site
Google Site of Carlo Emanuele Ruspoli
Blogspot of Carlo Emanuele Ruspoli
Books of Carlo Emanuele Ruspoli

See also

Ruspoli.

1949 births
Living people
Carlo
Dukes of Italy
Nobility from Rome
Italian Roman Catholics
Commanders of the Order of Merit of the Italian Republic
Recipients of the Order of Isabella the Catholic
Knights Commander of the Order of St Gregory the Great
20th-century Italian architects
21st-century Italian architects
21st-century Italian writers
21st-century Italian male writers
Architects from Rome